A loan sale is a sale, often by a bank, under contract of all or part of the cash stream from a specific loan, thereby removing the loan from the bank's balance sheet.

Often subprime loans from failed banks in the United States are sold by the Federal Deposit Insurance Corporation (FDIC) in an online auction format through companies. Performing loans are also sold between financial institutions.

See also
Internet Data Exchange (IDX)
Commercial Information Exchange

External links 
 Federal Deposit Insurance Corporation

Credit
Loans